is a railway station on the Hachinohe Line in the town of Hirono, Kunohe District, Iwate Prefecture, Japan. It is operated by  the East Japan Railway Company (JR East).

Lines
Rikuchū-Yagi Station is served by the Hachinohe Line, and is 43.1 kilometers from the terminus of the line at Hachinohe Station.

Station layout
Rikuchū-Yagi Station has two opposed ground-level side platforms serving two tracks. The platforms are connected to the station building by a level crossing. The station is unattended.

Platforms

History

Rikuchū-Yagi Station opened on 1 November 1925. With the privatization of Japanese National Railways (JNR) on 1 April 1987, the station came under the control of JR East. The station was made unstaffed from 10 December 2005. A new station building and waiting room was completed in March 2008.

Bus services
Bus services to Kuji and Samuraihama are operated by JR Bus Tohoku Company.

Surrounding area
 Yagi Post Office

See also
 List of railway stations in Japan

References

External links

  

Railway stations in Iwate Prefecture
Hirono, Iwate
Hachinohe Line
Railway stations in Japan opened in 1925
Stations of East Japan Railway Company